Steffen Tölzer (born June 12, 1985) is a German professional ice hockey defenceman who currently plays for Starbulls Rosenheim in the Oberliga (3.GBun). He most notably played with Augsburger Panther of the Deutsche Eishockey Liga (DEL).

Career statistics

Regular season and playoffs

International

References

External links
 

1985 births
Living people
German ice hockey defencemen
Augsburger Panther players
EC Peiting players